La Luz is a small town of 733 people in  Luis Arcos Bergnes Popular Council, Camajuaní, Villa Clara, Cuba. Its neighboring towns are El Cubano (also known as La Flora), Carmita, Vega Alta, San Juan, Guerrero, and Canoa. Its estimated sea level is 7 meters above sea level

Education 
In La Luz there is one school, with it being 

 Delfín Sen Cedré Primary

Economy
According at the DMPF of Camajuani, La Luz is a settlement not linked to any source of an economic or job development but still are maintained.

Sports 
In the town there is one sports club, with it being the Peña CCS Orestes Acosta.

See also
 Santa Clara, Cuba 
 Aguada de Moya, Cuba

References 

1703 establishments in North America
Populated places in Villa Clara Province
Populated places established in 1703
1703 establishments in the Spanish Empire